Newington station may refer to:

Transportation:
Newington railway station, on the Chatham Main Line, serving the village of Newington, Kent, England
Newington Junction station, a CTfastrak bus station and former rail depot in Newington, Connecticut, United States
Newington railway station (Scotland), a former station on the Edinburgh Suburban and Southside Junction Railway in Newington, Edinburgh, Scotland

Location:
Newington Junction, a neighborhood in Newington, Connecticut, United States
Newington Station (Virginia), a neighborhood in Springfield, Virginia, United States

Other:
Newington Power Plant, located near Portsmouth, New Hampshire, United States, also known as Newington Station